Olivier Klemenczak (born 1 June 1996) is a French rugby union player who plays for Racing 92 in the Top 14 and the French national team. His position is centre.

References

External links 
 Racing 92 profile

1996 births
Living people
People from Cormeilles-en-Parisis
French rugby union players
US Dax players
Racing 92 players
Rugby union centres
Sportspeople from Val-d'Oise